

The DuPont Aerospace DP-1 was a subscale prototype for a fixed-wing VSTOL transport aircraft, intended to take off and land like a helicopter and fly like an airplane. The fullscale aircraft, named DP-2, was designed to travel at high subsonic speeds with a greater range than its rotary-wing equivalent, and to allow troops to rappel from the aft cargo ramp. The development of the 53% scale DP-1 aircraft was originally funded in the early 1990s as a backup to the V-22 Osprey program, which was undergoing significant technical and political challenges.  During the construction of the test aircraft, program management changed the requirements, and mandated that the vehicle be tested as a UAV.  This change added significant cost and time to the project, but in September 2007, the DP-1 autonomous prototype achieved sustained, controlled tethered hovers of 45 seconds at the Gillespie Field test site.

On June 13, 2007, the U.S. House Committee on Science and Technology held a hearing about the fate of the DP-2. In August 2007, funding was finally cut, after a total of $63 million spent over nearly two decades.

References

External links
"DP-1 UAV achieves autonomous tethered hover"
"The Aircraft That Can't Fly; Congress' $63 Million Boondoggle" (ABC News)
DP-2 Profile at Global Security
"Hunter's Folly: $63 Million Aircraft Can't Fly" (Wired)
"Heavily criticized plane is defunded" (Copley News Service)

2000s United States military transport aircraft
VTOL aircraft
DP-1
Twinjets
Mid-wing aircraft
Aircraft first flown in 2007